This article contains a chronological summary of major events from the 2012 Summer Paralympics in London.

All times are in British Summer Time (UTC+1).

Calendar

29 August
Opening ceremony - The opening ceremony took place from 20:00 to 0:20 and featured public figures in attendance, as well as Stephen Hawking. The Cauldron was lit by Margaret Maughan, while Queen Elizabeth II opened the games.

30 August
Cycling
Women's individual pursuit C1-3
Women's individual pursuit C4
Women's individual pursuit C5
Men's individual pursuit B
Men's time trial C1-3

Judo
Men's 60 kg
Men's 66 kg
Women's 48 kg
Women's 52 kg

Powerlifting
Women's 40 kg
Men's 48 kg

Shooting
Men's 10 metre air pistol SH1
Women's 10 metre air rifle standing SH1

Swimming
Men's 50 metre freestyle S5
Men's 400 metre freestyle S12
Men's 100 metre butterfly S8
Men's 100 metre butterfly S9
Men's 50 metre breaststroke SB2
Men's 100 metre backstroke S6
Men's 100 metre backstroke S7
Men's 200 metre individual medley SM10
Women's 50 metre freestyle S5
Women's 400 metre freestyle S12
Women's 100 metre butterfly S8
Women's 100 metre butterfly S9
Women's 100 metre backstroke S6
Women's 100 metre backstroke S7
Women's 200 metre individual medley SM10

31 August
Athletics
Men's club throw F31/32/51
Women's long jump F37-38
Women's discus throw F35-36
Men's shot put F42-44
Men's 200 metres T37
Women's 100 metres T34
Men's discus throw F57–58
Men's shot put F52-53
Men's long jump F42-44
Women's discus throw F40
Women's 200 metres T35

Cycling
Women's individual B 1 km time trial
Men's individual pursuit C1
Men's individual pursuit C2
Men's individual pursuit C3
Men's individual C4-5 1 km time trial

Judo
Men's 73 kg
Men's 81 kg
Women's 57 kg
Women's 63 kg

Powerlifting
Women's 44 kg
Men's 52 kg
Men's 56 kg

Shooting
Men's 10 metre air rifle standing SH1
Women's 10 metre air pistol SH1

Swimming
Men's 400 metre freestyle S8
Women's 400 metre freestyle S8
Men's 50 metre butterfly S7
Women's 50 metre butterfly S7
Men's 50 metre freestyle S10
Women's 50 metre freestyle S10
Men's 100 metre backstroke S9
Women's 100 metre backstroke S9
Men's 100 metre freestyle S11
Women's 100 metre freestyle S11
Men's 100 metre backstroke S14
Women's 100 metre backstroke S14
Men's 100 metre butterfly S13
Women's 200 metre individual medley SM5
Men's 50 metre freestyle S4

1 September
Athletics
Women's club throw F31/32/51
Men's shot put F54/55/56
Men's long jump F13
Men's 200 metres T42
Women's discus throw F11/12
Women's 200 metres T36
Women's 100 metres T38
Women's shot put F54/55/56
Men's javelin throw F33/34
Men's 100 metres T13
Men's triple jump F46
Men's 100 metres T35
Women's javelin throw F46
Women's 200 metres T52
Men's 800 metres T37
Men's 100 metres T38
Women's 200 metres T46

Cycling
Men's individual 1 km time trial B
Men's individual pursuit C4
Men's individual pursuit C5
Women's individual 500m time trial C1-3
Women's individual 500m time trial C4-5

Equestrian
Individual Championship Test - Grade II
Individual Championship Test - Grade Ib

Judo
Men's 90 kg
Men's 100 kg
Men's +100 kg
Women's 70 kg
Women's +70 kg

Powerlifting
Women's 48 kg
Women's 52 kg
Men's 60 kg

Shooting
Mixed R5 10 metre air rifle prone SH2
Mixed R3 10 metre air rifle prone SH1

Swimming
Men's 100 metre butterfly S10
Women's 100 metre butterfly S10
Men's 400 metre freestyle S6
Women's 400 metre freestyle S6
Men's 100 metre breaststroke SB8
Women's 100 metre breaststroke SB8
Men's 200 metre freestyle S5
Women's 200 metre freestyle S5
Men's 50 metre freestyle S11
Women's 50 metre freestyle S11
Men's 50 metre freestyle S13
Women's 50 metre freestyle S13
Men's 100 metre breaststroke SB7
Women's 100 metre breaststroke SB7
Men's 200 metre freestyle S2

2 September
Athletics
Women's 200 metres T11
Women's javelin throw F12-13
Women's shot put F35–36
Women's long jump F42-44
Men's 100 metres T36
Women's 5000 metres T54
Women's 100 metres T37
Men's 400 metres T53
Men's discus throw F42
Men's 100 metres T52
Men's javelin throw F44
Men's 200 metres T46
Women's long jump F46
Women's 100 metres T12
Men's 100 metres T54
Men's 400 metres T13
Men's discus throw F11
Women's 100 metres T53
Men's 200 metres T44
Women's 100 metres T44
Men's 5000 metres T54

Cycling
Men's individual sprint B
Women's individual pursuit B
Mixed team sprint C1-5

Equestrian
Individual Championship Test - Grade IV
Individual Championship Test - Grade III
Individual Championship Test - Grade Ia

Powerlifting
Women's 56 kg
Men's 67.5 kg
Women's 60 kg

Rowing
Women's single sculls ASW1x
Men's single sculls ASM1x
Mixed double sculls TAMix2x
Mixed coxed four LTAMix4+

Shooting
Mixed R4 10 metre air rifle standing SH2

Swimming
Men's 200 metre individual medley SM7
Women's 200 metre individual medley SM7
Men's 200 metre freestyle S14
Women's 200 metre freestyle S14
Men's 100 metre backstroke S11
Women's 100 metre backstroke S11
Men's 100 metre freestyle S13
Women's 100 metre freestyle S13
Men's 100 metre butterfly S12
Men's 150 metre individual medley SM4
Women's 50 metre freestyle S8
Men's 150 metre individual medley SM3
Men's 4 x 100 metre freestyle relay 34pts
Women's 100 metre butterfly S12

Table tennis
Women's singles - Class 11
Men's singles - Class 3
Men's singles - Class 6
Women's singles - Class 1-2
Men's singles - Class 9
Men's singles - Class 5
Men's singles - Class 7
Women's singles - Class 4
Women's singles - Class 8
Women's singles - Class 5
Men's singles - Class 10

3 September
Archery
Men's individual recurve W1/W2
Men's individual recurve Standing
Men's individual compound W1
Men's individual compound Open

Athletics
Men's shot put F11-12
Men's long jump F46
Men's discus throw F35–36
Men's 100 metres T53
Men's 400 metres T52
Women's 400 metres T54
Women's shot put F42–44
Women's 400 metres T13
Women's long jump F20
Women's javelin throw F33–34/52–53
Men's 100 metres T51
Men's 400 metres T38
Men's high jump F42
Men's 5000 metres T12
Men's 1500 metres T11
Men's 1500 metres T37

Equestrian
Individual Freestyle Test - Grade II
Individual Freestyle Test - Grade Ib

Powerlifting
Women's 67.5 kg
Women's 75 kg
Men's 75 kg

Shooting
Mixed P3 25 metre pistol SH1

Swimming
Men's 200 metre individual medley SM6
Women's 200 metre individual medley SM6
Men's 100 metre freestyle S7
Women's 100 metre freestyle S7
Men's 100 metre freestyle S2
Women's 100 metre freestyle S3
Men's 100 metre breaststroke SB11
Women's 100 metre breaststroke SB11
Men's 200 metre individual medley SM12
Women's 200 metre individual medley SM12
Men's 100 metre backstroke S13
Men's 50 metre freestyle S8
Men's 50 metre breaststroke SB3
Women's 4 x 100 metre freestyle relay 34pts

Table tennis
Men's singles– Class 11
Women's singles– Class 3
Women's singles– Class 6
Men's singles– Class 1
Men's singles– Class 8
Women's singles– Class 7
Men's singles– Class 2
Women's singles– Class 9
Men's singles– Class 4
Women's singles– Class 10

4 September
Archery
Women's individual recurve - W1/W2
Women's individual recurve - Open
Women's individual compound - Open

Athletics
Men's shot put F57-58
Men's javelin throw F52–53
Men's long jump F11
Men's 400 metres T46
Women's shot put F37
Men's 200 metres T34
Men's 200 metres T11
Women's discus throw F57–58
Men's shot put F34
Men's 1500 metres T13
Men's long jump F20
Men's 100 metres T12
Men's 1500 metres T20
Women's 1500 metres T12
Men's 1500 metres T46
Men's 400 metres T36
Men's discus throw F40
Women's 400 metres T12
Men's 1500 metres T54
Women's 4x100 metre relay T35/38

Boccia
Mixed pairs BC4
Mixed pairs BC3
Mixed pairs BC1-2

Equestrian
Individual Freestyle Test - Grade IV
Individual Freestyle Test - Grade III
Individual Freestyle Test - Grade Ia

Powerlifting
Men's 82.5 kg
Women's 82.5 kg
Men's 90 kg

Shooting
Men's R6 50 metre rifle 3 positions SH1

Swimming
Men's 100 metre backstroke S8
Women's 100 metre backstroke S8
Men's 50 metre freestyle S6
Women's 50 metre freestyle S6
Men's 400 metre freestyle S9
Women's 400 metre freestyle S9
Men's 100 metre backstroke S10
Women's 100 metre backstroke S10
Men's 100 metre breaststroke SB4
Women's 100 metre breaststroke SB4
Men's 100 metre freestyle S12
Women's 100 metre freestyle S12
Men's 50 metre freestyle S7
Women's 50 metre freestyle S7
Men's 400 metre freestyle S13

Wheelchair fencing
Men's individual foil - Category A
Women's individual foil - Category A
Women's individual foil - Category B
Men's individual foil - Category B

5 September
Archery
Men's team recurve - Open
Women's team recurve - Open

Athletics
Women's shot put F11-12 ·
Men's discus throw F54–56
Men's shot put F32-33
Men's long jump F36 ·
Women's 200 metres T37
Men's shot put F37-38
Men's 4 × 100 metres relay#T11-T13
Women's javelin throw F54–56
Men's long jump F37-38
Men's javelin throw F12-13
Men's 800 metres T12
Men's 800 metres#T53
Women's shot put F20 ·
Women's 800 metres T53
Women's 1500 metres T20
Women's 100 metres T11
Women's 100 metres T42
Women's 100 metres T46
Women's 100 metres T52
Women's 800 metres T54
Men's 4 × 100 metres relay T42-46

Cycling
Men's individual time trial C5
Men's individual time trial C4
Men's individual time trial C3
Men's individual time trial C2
Men's individual time trial C1
Women's individual time trial C5
Women's individual time trial C4
Women's individual time trial C1-3
Men's individual time trial B
Women's individual time trial B
Men's individual time trial H4
Men's individual time trial H3
Men's individual time trial H2
Men's individual time trial H1
Women's individual time trial H4
Women's individual time trial H3
Women's individual time trial H1-2
Mixed road time trial T1-2

Powerlifting
Men's 100 kg
Women's +82.5 kg
Men's +100 kg

Shooting
Men's R7 50 metre rifle 3 positions SH1

Swimming
Men's 200 metre individual medley SM8
Women's 200 metre individual medley SM8
Men's 400 metre freestyle S10
Women's 400 metre freestyle S10
Men's 100 metre breaststroke SB5
Women's 100 metre breaststroke SB5
Men's 100 metre backstroke S12
Women's 100 metre backstroke S12
Men's 100 metre breaststroke SB6
Women's 100 metre breaststroke SB6
Men's 50 metre backstroke S2
Men's 50 metre freestyle S9
Women's 50 metre freestyle S9
Men's 100 metre freestyle S4
Women's 50 metre backstroke S2

Wheelchair fencing
Men's individual épée A
Women's individual épée A
Men's individual épée B
Women's individual épée B

Wheelchair tennis
Quad Doubles

6 September
Athletics at the 2012 Summer Paralympics
Men's discus throw F51–53
Men's triple jump F11
Women's 200 metres T38
Men's shot put F40
Women's discus throw F37
Women's 200 metres T34
Men's 100 metres T46
Women's 200 metres T12
Men's 400 metres T12
Women's shot put F32-34
Women's javelin throw F57–58
Men's 200 metres T36
Men's 800 metres T36
Women's 100 metres T13
Men's 200 metres T35
Women's 200 metres T43-44
Men's shot put F46
Men's discus throw F44
Women's 200 metres T53
Men's 800 metres T54
Men's 100 metres T44

Cycling
Men's individual road race C4-5
Women's individual road race C1-3
Men's individual road race C1-3
Women's individual road race C4-5

Sailing
Three-person keelboat - Sonar - canceled
Two-person keelboat - SKUD18 - canceled
Single-person keelboat - 2.4mR - canceled

Shooting
Women's R8 50 metre rifle 3 positions SH1
Mixed P4 50 metre pistol SH1

Swimming
Men's 200 metre individual medley SM9
Women's 200 metre individual medley SM9
Men's 400 metre freestyle S7
Women's 400 metre freestyle S7
Men's 100 metre breaststroke SB14
Women's 100 metre breaststroke SB14
Men's 50 metre backstroke S4
Women's 50 metre backstroke S4
Men's 100 metre freestyle S8
Women's 100 metre freestyle S8
Men's 50 metre backstroke S5
Men's 100 metre freestyle S10
Women's 100 metre freestyle S10
Men's 100 metre butterfly S11
Men's 50 metre backstroke S1

Wheelchair fencing
Men's individual sabre A
Men's individual sabre B

7 September
Athletics
Women's discus throw F51–53
Men's javelin throw F40
Men's 100 metres T42
Women's long jump F11-12
Men's javelin throw F42
Men's 200 metres T53
Men's discus throw F32-34
Men's shot put F20
Men's discus throw F37–38
Men's 200 metres T13
Women's 100 metres T35
Women's long jump F13
Men's 5000 metres T11
Men's 800 metres T52
Men's 400 metres T54
Women's 1500 metres T54    ·
Men's 400 metres T11

Cycling
Women's individual road race H1-3
Men's individual road race H1 ·
Men's individual road race H3 ·
Women's individual road race H4
Men's individual road race H4 ·
Men's individual road race H2 ·

Goalball
Women's
Men's

Sitting volleyball
Women's

Swimming
Men's 100 metre freestyle S9
Women's 100 metre freestyle S9
Men's 400 metre freestyle S11
Women's 400 metre freestyle S11
Men's 50 metre butterfly S6
Women's 50 metre butterfly S6
Men's 50 metre freestyle S2
Women's 50 metre freestyle S3
Men's 50 metre butterfly S5
Women's 50 metre butterfly S5
Men's 50 metre freestyle S12
Women's 50 metre freestyle S12
Men's 200 metre individual medley SM13
Women's 200 metre individual medley SM13
Women's 4 x 100 metre medley relay 34pts

Table tennis
Men's team – Class 1–2
Men's team – Class 3
Men's team – Class 6–8
Women's team – Class 1–3

Wheelchair basketball
Women's tournament

Wheelchair fencing
Women's team - Open

Wheelchair tennis
Men's Doubles
Women's Singles

8 September
Athletics
Men's 100 metres T37
Women's shot put F57–58
Men's triple jump F12
Men's javelin throw F54–56
Women's 100 metres T36
Women's javelin throw F37–38
Men's 200 metres T52
Men's 100 metres T34
Men's 200 metres T38
Women's 100 metres T54
Women's 400 metres T37
Men's 800 metres T13
Men's 100 metres T11
Men's 4 × 400 metres relay T53-T54 ·
Men's javelin throw F57–58
Men's high jump F46
Men's shot put F40
Women's 400 metres T46
Men's 200 metres T12 ·
Men's 800 metres T46
Women's 400 metres T53
Men's 400 metres T44

Boccia
Mixed Individual BC1
Mixed Individual BC3
Mixed Individual BC4
Mixed Individual BC2

Cycling
Women's individual road race B
Mixed road race T1-2
Men's individual road race B
Mixed road team relay H1-4

Football 5-a-side
Men's

Sitting volleyball
Men's

Swimming

Table tennis
Women's team - Class 4-5
Men's team – Class 4–5
Women's team - Class 6-10
Men's team – Class 9–10

Wheelchair basketball
Men's tournament

Wheelchair fencing
Men's team - Open

Wheelchair tennis
Men's singles
Quad singles
Women's doubles

9 September
Athletics
Men's marathon T12
Men's marathon T46
Men's marathon T54
Women's marathon T54

Football 7-a-side
Men's

Wheelchair rugby
Mixed

Closing ceremony

References

Chrono
2012